Laktaši is a city located in Republika Srpska, an entity of the state Bosnia and Herzegovina. As of 2013, the municipality had a population of 34,966 inhabitants, while the town has a population of 5,879 inhabitants.

Geography

Physical geography
Laktaši municipality is located in Lijevče polje, 19 km north of Banja Luka. The river Vrbas, which flows in the middle of its territory, divides it into the Župa (right bank of the Vrbas) and the Potkozarsko-Lijevčanski part (the left bank of the Vrbas). Lijevče polje, along the fertile Semberian plains, a geographical part of the Peripanon region, is the main granary of Republika Srpska.

Political geography
The Laktaši municipality is located in the northeastern part of the entity of Republika Srpska on the coordinates of 44°54′33″N and 17°18′06″E and borders the city of Banja Luka, and the municipalities of Gradiška, Srbac, Prnjavor and Čelinac. Laktaši municipality takes up an area of 338,37 km2 (149,95 sq mi).

The area of this municipality has had a favorable traffic position in the past, beginning with the time of the Romans, when the so-called "salt path" that connected Salona to Servicio. Today, the Banja Luka - Gradiška and Banja Luka - Doboj highways pass through the Laktaši municipality, connecting the Laktaši municipality with the Zagreb - Belgrade highway, and in the future with the Budapest - Ploče highway. Laktaši municipality also has the only international airport in the Republic of Srpska, located north of the Laktaši town, near the village of Mahovljani.

Climate
Laktaši municipality has a continental climate, with harsh winters and warm summers. The warmest month of the year is July, with an average temperature of 25°C (77°F). The coldest month of the year is January, when temperatures average -5°C (23 °F). Annual precipitation forLaktaši municipality is about 875 mm. Due to the city's high latitude; it snows almost every year as well. Strong winds come from the north and northeast bringing in much snow.

Demographics
According to the 2013 census results, the municipality of Laktaši has a population of 34,966 inhabitants.

Population

Ethnic composition

Economy
The following table gives a preview of total number of registered employed people per their core activity (as of 2016):

Sport
The most prominently known local sports team is basketball team KK Igokea based in Aleksandrovac. KK Igokea is a regular competitor in the regional Adriatic League and one of the two teams from Bosnia and Herzegovina that played in EuroCup. The local football club, FK Laktaši, plays in the Second League of Republika Srpska.

Twin towns – sister cities

Laktaši is twinned with:
 Budva, Montenegro
 Čajetina, Serbia

Other forms of cooperation:

 Lehavim, Israel
 Seiersberg-Pirka, Austria
 Veria, Greece
 Zrenjanin, Serbia

See also
 Municipalities of Republika Srpska
 Laktaši Sports Hall

References

External links

 
 Banja Laktaši
 Laktasi Travel Guide - android aplikacija

Populated places in Laktaši
Cities and towns in Republika Srpska
Laktaši